Elections for the House of Representatives of the Philippines were held on November 10, 1953. Held on the same day as the presidential election, the party of the incumbent president, Elpidio Quirino's Liberal Party, won majority of the seats in the House of Representatives. However, Ramon Magsaysay of the opposition Nacionalista Party was elected president, and several elected Liberal Party congressmen defected to the Nacionalista Party, leading to José Laurel, Jr. being elected Speaker of the House of Representatives.

The elected representatives served in the 3rd Congress from 1953 to 1957.

Results

Note

A.  The combined number of seats of the Liberal Party after the two factions merged back together.

See also
3rd Congress of the Philippines

References

  

1953
1953 elections in the Philippines